Olayiwola Fatai Olagunju, known professionally as Fatai Rolling Dollar (22 July 1927 – 12 June 2013), was a Nigerian jùjú singer, songwriter and multi-instrumentalist, described by the BBC as a "nationally celebrated performer."

Biography
He started his musical career in 1953 and had mentored a number of musicians including Ebenezer Obey and the late Orlando Owoh. He was known for his dexterity at playing the guitar, Rolling Dollar's last major hit was "Won Kere Si Number Wa".

In 1957, he formed an eight-piece band called Fatai Rolling Dollar and his African Rhythm Band, and they recorded numerous seven-inch singles for Phillips West Africa Records.

Death
He died peacefully in his sleep. He was buried in Ikorodu, Lagos He was the oldest surviving music artist in Nigeria.

Discography

Album

References

1927 births
2013 deaths
Nigerian male musicians
Musicians from Osun State
Yoruba musicians
Yoruba-language singers
20th-century Nigerian musicians
21st-century Nigerian musicians
Deaths from cancer in Nigeria
Burials in Lagos State
20th-century male musicians
21st-century male musicians